Braja Kishore Tripathy (born 25 September 1947) was a member of the 14th Lok Sabha of India. He represented the Puri Lok Sabha Constituency of Orissa as a member of the Biju Janata Dal (BJD). He was a Cabinet Minister in NDA government in 13th Lok Sabha. He joined the Bharatiya Janata Party after resigning from BJD in 2009 and unsuccessfully contested the elections from the Puri Lok Sabha Constituency.

On 13 May 2013, he floated a new political party in Odisha and has named it the Samata Kranti Dal. Tribal Leader from Odisha George Tirkey, MLA Biramitrapur has been appointed the President of the Samata Kranti Dal. Veteran Socialist Leader and acclaimed Journalist Rabi Rath is the vice president of the party.

References

External links
 Members of Fourteenth Lok Sabha - Parliament of India website

People from Puri
Biju Janata Dal politicians
Bharatiya Janata Party politicians from Odisha
India MPs 1991–1996
India MPs 1998–1999
India MPs 1999–2004
India MPs 2004–2009
1947 births
Living people
Lok Sabha members from Odisha